This is a list of lists of shopping malls and shopping centers by country. A shopping mall is one or more buildings forming a complex of shops representing merchandisers, with interconnecting walkways enabling visitors to walk from unit to unit. Other establishments including movie theaters and restaurants are also often included.

Shopping malls

 Albania
 Algeria
 Angola
 Azerbaijan
 Argentina
 Australia
 Shopping centres in Australia by size
 Austria
 Bahrain
 Bangladesh
 Belgium
 Brazil
 Bulgaria
 Cambodia
 Canada
 Largest shopping malls in Canada
 Chile
 China
 Croatia
 Cyprus
 Czech Republic
 Denmark
 Egypt
 Estonia
 Finland
 France
 Germany
 Ghana
 Greece
 Hong Kong
 Hungary
 India
 Indonesia
 Iran
 Ireland
 Israel
 Italy
 Japan
 Kenya
 Latvia
 Lebanon
 Lithuania
 Malaysia
 Malta
 Mexico
 Namibia
 Nepal
 New Zealand
 Nicaragua
 Nigeria
 Largest shopping malls in Nigeria
 North Macedonia
 Norway
 Pakistan
 Peru
 Philippines
 Largest shopping malls in the Philippines
 Poland
 Romania
 San Marino
 Saudi Arabia
 Serbia
 Singapore
 Slovakia
 South Africa
 Sweden
 Taiwan
 Thailand
 Largest shopping malls in Thailand
 Turkey
 Ukraine
 United Arab Emirates
 United Kingdom
 United States
 Largest shopping malls in the United States
 Venezuela
 Vietnam
 Zambia
 Zimbabwe

See also

 List of buildings and structures
 List of largest shopping malls
 List of shopping streets and districts by city